Helie of Burgundy ( – 28 February 1141) was the daughter of Odo I, Duke of Burgundy and Sibylla of Burgundy, Duchess of Burgundy.

In June 1095, Helie married Bertrand of Toulouse, as his second wife. They had one son, Pons of Tripoli (–1137).

Bertrand succeeded his father as Count of Toulouse in 1105, and in 1108, he set out for Outremer to claim his father's rights as Count of Tripoli. Helie accompanied him on this expedition, which resulted in the capture of Tripoli in 1109; shortly after, their nephew, William-Jordan died of wounds, giving Bertrand an undisputed claim to Tripoli.

Bertrand died in 1112, and Pons succeeded him in Tripoli. Helie returned to France, where she married William III of Ponthieu in 1115. They had twelve children, including two named Robert, two named William, and two named Enguerrand:
Guy II of Ponthieu (d. 1147)
William (d. aft. 1166)
Robert
Robert de Garennes (d. aft. 1171), a monk
William
Enguerrand
Enguerrand
Mabile
John I, Count of Alençon (d. 1191)
Clemence (d. bef. 1189), married Juhel, Sire de Mayenne
Philippa (d. bef. 1149)
Ela (aka Adela) (d. 10 October 1174), married first William de Warenne, 3rd Earl of Surrey, and second Patrick of Salisbury, 1st Earl of Salisbury

Helie died on 28 February 1141, in Perseigne Abbey in Neufchâtel-en-Saosnois.

Notes

References

Bibliography

1080s births
1141 deaths
Year of birth uncertain
House of Burgundy
Countesses of Toulouse
Countesses of Tripoli
Women of the Crusader states